Kwekwe East Airport  is an airport serving Kwekwe, a mining town in Midlands Province, Zimbabwe.

See also
Transport in Zimbabwe

References

Directory of Airports in Zimbabwe
 Geonames/Zimbabwe

External links

Airports in Zimbabwe
Buildings and structures in Midlands Province